The 2011 Fort Worth mayoral election was held on May 14 and June 18, 2011 to elect the next mayor of Fort Worth, Texas. The incumbent mayor Mike Moncrief did not seek reelection after having served four terms as mayor of Fort Worth since 2003. Republican Betsy Price won the election against Democrat Jim Lane and succeeded Moncrief on July 12, 2011.

Qualifications
As with most cities in Texas, a candidate for mayor does not run on a partisan ballot. The only qualifications for a candidate are:
 Be a United States citizen
 Be 21 years of age
 Be a qualified voter
 Considered of sound mind with no mental impediments
 No prior felony record for which one has not been pardoned
 Resided continuously in the state for 12 months and the city and/or district for 6 months before the first filing date

Candidates
 Dan Barrett - attorney, former Texas State Representative (2007–2009)
 Cathy Hirt - consultant, former Fort Worth City Council member (1996–1999)
 Jim Lane - attorney, Tarrant Regional Water Board, Fort Worth City Council member (1993–2005)
 Betsy Price - Tarrant County Tax Assessor (2001–2011)
 Nicholas Zebrun - videographer and filmmaker, producer and writer

Results

First-round

Runoff

References

External links
Election results
"Finding clarity in the Texas Constitution takes work"

mayoral election
Fort Worth mayoral
Fort Worth
Mayoral elections in Fort Worth, Texas
Non-partisan elections